The neuropeptide B/W receptors are members of the G-protein coupled receptor superfamily of integral membrane proteins which bind the neuropeptides B and W. These receptors are predominantly expressed in the CNS and have a number of functions including regulation of the secretion of cortisol.

References

External links

 
 

G protein-coupled receptors